Palacio Municipal De Deportes San Pablo is an arena in Seville, Spain. Built in 1988, it is primarily used for basketball and the home arena of CB Sevilla. The arena can hold up to 10,200 people.

Events
It hosted the European Aquatics Championships in August 1997 and also one of the group stages in the 2014 FIBA Basketball World Cup.

See also
 List of indoor arenas in Spain

External links

 Official website

San Pablo
San Pablo
San Pablo
Badminton venues
Indoor track and field venues
Sports venues in Seville
Sports venues completed in 1988
1988 establishments in Spain